The Cyclops Mountains are located to the west of Jayapura in Papua, Indonesia, and north of Lake Sentani.

In Indonesian, it is also known as Dafonsoro or in Sentani language, Dobonsolo, and is the namesake for football club Persidafon.

Geography

History
The Cyclops Mountains were given this name by Louis de Bougainville, who saw them from a distance while sailing along the north coast of New Guinea.

In the 1930s Evelyn Cheesman spent time in this area studying the insect fauna.

Ecology
The portions of the range above 1,000 meters are part of the Northern New Guinea montane rain forests ecoregion. The lower slopes and surrounding lowlands are in the Northern New Guinea lowland rain and freshwater swamp forests ecoregion.

The Cyclops long-beaked echidna (Zaglossus attenboroughi) was discovered living in the mountains. It is named for naturalist David Attenborough.

Cyclops Mountains Nature Reserve
The Cyclops Mountains were designated as a nature reserve in 1978/1995.

Eponyms
A species of lizard, Emoia cyclops (Cyclops emo skink), is named for the Cyclops Mountains.

Notes

Mountain ranges of Western New Guinea
Protected areas of Western New Guinea
Landforms of Papua (province)